"" (Now be joyful, you Christendom) is a Catholic hymn for Easter. It goes back to a 1390 hymn, which later appeared as "Freu dich, du werte Christenheit". The final version appeared first in the Catholic hymnal Gotteslob of 1975, later in several regional sections of the Gotteslob.

History 
The current hymn goes back to around 1390, when a Ein Mainzer Prozessionale (A Mainz processional, meaning a book of processional hymns) has a chant with the incipit "Disse oisterliche dage" (These Easter days). The five stanzas appear as verses of the Marian antiphon "Regina celi letare". A Breslau manuscript from 1478 lists three stanzas which are related to three stanzas of the Mainz source (1,2,5) but in reverse order, now beginning "Frew dich, alle Christenheit" (Be joyful, all Christendom).

The current text, finally "Nun freue dich, du Christenheit", was adapted for the first common Catholic hymnal, the Gotteslob of 1975, which had the hymn in its common section. The following edition Gotteslob of 2013 has it no longer in the common section, but in 19 of the 24 regional sections. The Diocese of Mainz has it as GL 817.

Melody 
The melody of "Freu dich, du werte Christenheit", and "" appeared in Mainz around in 1410. It was later used also for "".

References

External links 
 Liedvorschläge Lesejahr A Diocese of Paderborn
 liedertexte sites.google.com
 Nun freue dich, du Christenheit  (Setting by Hassler) Diocese of Passau
 Hermann Ühlein: Kirchenlied und Textgeschichte: literarische Traditionsbildung am Beispiel des deutschen Himmelfahrtsliedes von der Aufklärung bis zur Gegenwart Königshausen & Neumann, 1995

Catholic hymns in German
Easter hymns